The 1960–61 William & Mary Indians men's basketball team represented the College of William & Mary in intercollegiate basketball during the 1960–61 NCAA University Division men's basketball season. Under the fourth year of head coach Bill Chambers, the team finished the season 14–10 and 9–6 in the Southern Conference.

William & Mary played its home games at Blow Gymnasium with one home game played at the Norfolk Municipal Auditorium in Norfolk, Virginia. This was the 56th season of the collegiate basketball program at William & Mary, whose nickname is now the Tribe.

The Indians finished in 4th place in the conference and qualified for the 1961 Southern Conference men's basketball tournament, held at the Richmond Arena. William & Mary defeated fifth-seed Furman in the quarterfinals and top-seeded, and #8 in the country, West Virginia in the semifinals before falling to seventh-seed George Washington in the championship game.

The Indians did not participate in a post-season tournament.

Program notes
Jeff Cohen was named the Southern Conference Men's Basketball Player of the Year, the first ever conference player of the year award for a William & Mary player. The only other players to be named conference players of the year (SoCon, ECAC South, or CAA) have been Tom Jasper in 1970–71 and Marcus Thornton in 2014–15.
William & Mary's appearance in the Southern Conference championship game would be the second of nine such appearances (the others came in 1959, 1965, 1975, 1983, 2008, 2010, 2014, and 2015). Each of these games were also losses.

Schedule

|-
!colspan=9 style="background:#006400; color:#FFD700;"| Regular season

|-
!colspan=9 style="background:#006400; color:#FFD700;"| 1961 Southern Conference Basketball Tournament

Source

References

William & Mary Tribe men's basketball seasons
William and Mary
William and Mary
William and Mary